Clan Lyon is a Scottish clan.

History

Origins of the clan

Genealogist Sir Iain Moncreiffe stated that the Lyons were a family of Celtic origin and that they were descended from a younger son of the Clan Lamont. However it is more generally accepted that the Lyons descend from a French family called de Léon. At the end of the eleventh century the de Leons had come north with Edgar, son of Malcolm III of Scotland to fight against his uncle, Donald Bane. Edgar was victorious and the de Leons received lands that were later called Glen Lyon in Perthshire. In 1105 Roger de Leonne witnessed a charter from Edgar to Dunfermline Abbey.

14th, 15th and 16th centuries

Robert II of Scotland granted to Sir John Lyon, who was known as the White Lyon due to his complexion, the thanage of Glamis and five years later he was made Chamberlain of Scotland. Sir John Lyon married king Robert's daughter, Princess Jean Stewart which brought him the lands of Tannadice on the River Esk. Lyon was also granted the barony of Kinghorn, however he was later killed in a quarrel with Sir James Lindsay of Crawford.

Sir John Lyon's son, another John Lyon further strengthened the royal ties by marrying a granddaughter of Robert II. John's son, Patrick Lyon was created Lord Glamis in 1445. He became Master of the Household of Scotland and a Privy Councillor. He had previously been sent to England as a hostage in 1424 for the ransom of James I of Scotland.

John Lyon, 6th Lord Glamis was a quarrelsome man with a quick temper. He married Janet Douglas, Lady Glamis, granddaughter of Archibald Douglas, 5th Earl of Angus who was known as Bell the Cat, and after Douglas died she suffered terribly for the hatred that James V of Scotland had towards all of the name of Douglas. Lady Glamis was accused of witchcraft and despite speaking boldly in her own defense, she was burnt at the stake on castle hill in Edinburgh on 3 December 1540. Her young son was also sentenced to death when he came of age, however the king died before he had grown up and so he avoided the death sentence and was released. The king had taken possession of Glamis Castle and plundered it.

John Lyon, 8th Lord Glamis renounced his allegiance to Mary, Queen of Scots and served under the Regents Moray and Lennox. The 8th Lord was made Lord Chancellor of Scotland and also Keeper of the Great Seal of Scotland. The 9th Lord Glamis was captain of the Royal Guard and a Privy Councillor to James VI of Scotland. He was created Earl of Kinghorne, Viscount Lyon and Baron Glamis in 1606.

17th century and Civil War

John Lyon, 2nd Earl of Kinghorne was a close personal friend of James Graham, 1st Marquis of Montrose. Lyon was with Montrose in 1638 when he subscribed to the National Covenant. Lyon accompanied Montrose on his early campaigns in defense of the Covenant, however he did not support him when he chose to fight for Charles I of England. As a result, Lyon's estates were almost ruined for supporting the Army of the Covenant.

Patrick Lyon, 3rd Earl of Strathmore and Kinghorne paid off the debts that he had inherited from his father and was later able to enlarge Glamis Castle.

18th century and Jacobite risings

The 3rd Earl's son, John Lyon, 4th Earl of Strathmore and Kinghorne was a member of the Privy Council but opposed the 1707 Treaty of Union. During the Jacobite rising of 1715, his son was a Jacobite who fought at the Battle of Sheriffmuir and died defending his regiment's colours. James Francis Edward Stuart (the Old Pretender) stayed at Glamis in 1716 and amongst the relics of the castle today are a sword and watch that belonged to him.

During the Jacobite rising of 1745 the Duke of Cumberland stayed at Glamis on his march to the Battle of Culloden, but it is said that he was much less welcome.

Clan chiefs
Current Chief (assumed) - Simon Patrick Bowes-Lyon, 19th Earl of Strathmore and Kinghorne

1987-2016 – Rt Hon Michael Fergus Bowes-Lyon, DL, 18th Earl of Strathmore and Kinghorne

1972–1987 – Rt Hon Fergus Michael Claude Bowes-Lyon, 17th Earl of Strathmore and Kinghorne

1949–1972 – Timothy Patrick Bowes-Lyon, 16th Earl of Strathmore and Kinghorne

1944–1949 – Rt Hon Patrick Bowes-Lyon, 15th Earl of Strathmore and Kinghorne

1904–1944 – Rt Hon Claude George Bowes-Lyon, KG, KT, GCVO, TD, 14th Earl of Strathmore and Kinghorne

1865–1904 – Claude Bowes-Lyon, 13th Earl of Strathmore and Kinghorne

1846–1865 – Thomas Lyon-Bowes, 12th Earl of Strathmore and Kinghorne

1820–1846 – Thomas Lyon-Bowes, 11th Earl of Strathmore and Kinghorne

1776–1820 – John Lyon-Bowes, 10th Earl of Strathmore and Kinghorne

1753–1776 – John Bowes, 9th Earl of Strathmore and Kinghorne

1735–1753 – Thomas Lyon, 8th Earl of Strathmore and Kinghorne

1728–1735 – James Lyon, 7th Earl of Strathmore and Kinghorne

1695–1712 – Charles Lyon, 6th Earl of Strathmore and Kinghorne

1712–1715 – John Lyon, 5th Earl of Strathmore and Kinghorne

1695–1712 – John Lyon, 4th Earl of Strathmore and Kinghorne

1646–1695 – Patrick Lyon, 3rd Earl of Strathmore and Kinghorne

1615–1646 – John Lyon, 2nd Earl of Strathmore and Kinghorne

1606–1615 – Patrick Lyon, 1st Earl of Strathmore and Kinghorne

Clan castle

The seat of the chief of Clan Lyon is at Glamis Castle in Angus, Scotland.

Clan arms

Quarterly, 1st & 4th, argent, a lion rampant azure, armed and langued gules, within a double tressure flory counterflory of the Second (Lyon); 2nd & 3rd, ermine, three bows stringed paleways Proper (Bowes); en surtout an inescutcheon azure, thereon a rose argent, barbed vert and seeded or, ensigned with the Imperial Crown Proper, within a double tressure flory counterflory of the Second, the said inescutcheon ensigned with an Earl’s coronet Proper (the said honourable augmentation being limited to the Earl of Strathmore and Kinghorne and to the heirs succeeding him in his said Earldom).

References

 
Lyon